Zhu Wuhua (Chinese: 朱物华; January 1902 – March 1998) was a Chinese electronics engineer. He was an acoustic expert and an academician of the Chinese Academy of Sciences.

Biography
Zhu was born in Yangzhou, Jiangsu Province, and graduated from Shanghai Jiao Tong University in 1923. He obtained his master's degree from MIT in 1924, and his doctor's degree from Harvard University in 1926. Zhu was a professor and advisor of Shanghai Jiao Tong University and a former president of the institution. Zhu was a founding member of Chinese Academy of Sciences, elected in 1955.

1902 births
1998 deaths
Academic staff of the National Southwestern Associated University
Chinese electronics engineers
Educators from Yangzhou
Engineers from Jiangsu
Academic staff of Harbin Institute of Technology
Harvard School of Engineering and Applied Sciences alumni
Massachusetts Institute of Technology alumni
Members of the Chinese Academy of Sciences
Academic staff of Peking University
People's Republic of China politicians from Jiangsu
Presidents of Shanghai Jiao Tong University
Politicians from Yangzhou
National Chiao Tung University (Shanghai) alumni
Academic staff of Sun Yat-sen University